George Xie is an International Master (IM) of chess, chess tutor, modern chess philosopher  and former Australian Open chess champion.

Career
George Xie tied for first in the 2009 and 2011 Australian Open Chess Championship tournaments, winning the Australian Open Champion title on countback in 2011. 

He became an International Master in 2006 and was ranked 3rd in Australia. He was a board 4 member of the Australian national team at the 2008 Dresden Olympiad, and board 3 member of the Australian national team at the 39th Chess Olympiad in Khanty-Manisysk, Russia.

At age 16, Xie won the NSW state championship with a perfect score of 9/9, and he did it again in 2004 NSW state championship.

He gained his first GM norm at the 2009 Sydney International Open, tying =1st (2nd on tiebreak) with 3 other GMs. He exceeded the score required for a norm by half a point. Earlier, he had missed a norm at the 2009 Doeberl Cup in Canberra by half a point.

He came equal first with Aleksandar Wohl in the 2009 Australian Open Chess Championship held in Manly, Sydney. No playoff was held and the title was awarded to Wohl on tiebreak.

In 2010, Xie came second after Zhao Zong-Yuan in the 2010 Australian Chess Championship held in Sydney. He was equal first with Zhao before the last round with 9/10. He lost against Stephen Solomon in the last round while Zhao had won his game.

Xie's next major tournament in the same year was the 48th Doeberl Cup held in Canberra, Australia. By finishing second after Li Chao with 7/9, he was expected to be awarded a GM norm. In the tournament, Xie managed to share a point with Li Chao and defeated the 2010 Australian Chess Champion Zhao Zong-Yuan.

In January 2011, Xie defended his title in the Australian Open Chess Championship 2011 which he won two years earlier. The crosstable saw him tied with Moulthun Ly and Zhao Zong-Yuan with 8.5/11. The title was awarded to Xie because he had played the highest rated opposition.

Xie was a member of the 2008 and 2010 Australian Chess Olympiad teams.

As of 25 May 2010, Xie had all three Grandmaster norms, and would've qualified to be a grandmaster had his FIDE rating reached 2500.

Notable tournament wins
2002 NSW State Championship
2002 Fischer's Ghost Open
2003 Inter-leagues club competition
2003 University of NSW Chess Club Championship
2003 Fairfield Winter Cup
2003 Ryde-Eastwood Open
2003 Gosford Open
2003 November Chess Weekender
2004 Australian Day Weekender
2004 Rosebay Open
2004 Ryde-Eastwood Open
2004 Coffs-Harbour Open
2004 City of Sydney Championship
2004 NSW State championship
2005 City of Sydney Championship
2005 ST George May Weekender
2005 Vikings Open
2006 Australian Masters
2006 NSW Open
2007 NSW Rapid event
2007 Rooty Hill Rapid tournament
2007 Coffs Harbour Open
2007 Viking Open
2008 Mingara Open
2008 City of Parramatta Open  
2009 Australian Open Championship
2009 Ryde-Eastwood Open
2009 Fischer Ghost Open
2009 Sydney International Open (=1st)
2010 Dubbo Open
2010 Australian Day Open
2011 Australian Open Championship
2011 Gosford Open
2012 ANU Chess Open
2012 Foundation Day Open
2012 Adelaide Checkmate Open 
2012 Oceania Blitz Chess Championship
2023 Australian Day Weekender
2023 City of Sydney Rapid Championship (=1st)

Chess Philosophy

After played hundreds of chess tournaments and thousands of chess games. George Xie starts develop his own chess philosophy. Here are some of the most popular George Xie's chess quotation:

“The good chess player may not always be lucky, but bad losers are always angry”

“A real chess player should never quit chess, because you don’t have to run or chase balls when you playing chess”

“Chess is similar to mathematics; you must remember certain formula in order to make it works”.

“A winning chess player win with preparation and then he goes to tournament. A losing player goes to tournament and then seek to win”

Above quotation come from George Xie's ICC Profile

References

External links

Profile at Internet Chess Club (ICC)
2005 Interview

1985 births
Living people
Australian chess players
Australian people of Chinese descent
Chess International Masters
Chess Olympiad competitors